Surtan-Uzyak (Surtanüźäk) is a rural locality (a village) in Matrayevsky Selsoviet, Zilairsky District, Bashkortostan, Russia. The population was 59 as of 2010. There are 3 streets.

Geography 
Surtan-Uzyak is located 63 km east of Zilair (the district's administrative centre) by road. Balapan is the nearest rural locality.

References 

Rural localities in Zilairsky District